Nallankulam is a small village in Nanguneri block in Tirunelveli district of Tamil Nadu State, India. It comes under Dhalapathi Samuthram Panchayath.

Demographics
Tamil is the local language.

Government

Amenities
The postal head office is Dalapathisamudram.

Transport 
Nallankulam can be reach by train or bus. The nearest railway stations are Dalapathy Samudram Rail Way Station and Valliyur Rail Way Station.

The nearest bus stops are Thulukkarpatti, Good Samaritan Nagar, Rajarathna Nagar and Rajarethinam Nagar bus stops.

Vadakkuvalliyur, Panagudi, Nagercoil, Tirunelveli are the nearby cities.

Adjacent communities

References

Cities and towns in Tirunelveli district